Cecilia Abena Dapaah (born 27 November 1954) is a Ghanaian politician. She is a member of the New Patriotic Party and a former Member of Parliament for the Bantama constituency. She previously served as the deputy Minister for Water Resources, Works and Housing, and is the country's current Minister for Sanitation and Water Resources.

Early and educational life

Cecilia Dapaah was born on 27 November 1954 hails from Mpasatia in the Ashanti Region. She attended the University of Ghana, and graduated with a Bachelor of Arts degree in French and linguistics in 1979. She holds a certificate in leadership from the Harvard Kennedy School, and a postgraduate certificate in  International Development Studies from the University of Oslo.

Working life

Dapaah was a development worker by profession and a special assistant to President John Kufour. In 2001, she was appointed the chairperson of the Board of Ghana Cocoa Processing Company. She was moved from the board in 2005, and made the deputy Minister for Water Resources, Works and Housing. In 2007, she was made a substantive minister till the end of the John Kufour administration in 2008.

Political life

During the 2008 general elections, Dapaah contested and won the Bantama constituency elections. She received 36,708 votes out of the 48,476 which represented 75.7% of valid votes cast. Cecilia Dapaah was a member of the Parliament of Ghana from 2009 to 2013. She served on various parliamentary committees in Ghana including Works and Housing; Advisory Committee to the Speaker of the Parliament; Employment, Social welfare and Youth; Foreign Affairs; and Special Budget.

Elections  
Dapaah was elected as the member of parliament for the Bantama constituency of the Ashanti Region of Ghana for the first time in the 2004 Ghanaian general elections. She won on the ticket of the New Patriotic Party. Her constituency was a part of the 36 parliamentary seats out of 39 seats won by the New Patriotic Party in that election for the Ashanti Region. The New Patriotic Party won a majority total of 128 parliamentary seats out of 230 seats.  She was elected with 41,064 votes out of 49,174 total valid votes cast equivalent to 83.5% of total valid votes cast. She was elected over Alhasan Napoh of the National Democratic Congress  and Yaw Owusu Boafo of the Convention People's Party. These obtained 14.8% and 1.7% respectively of total valid votes cast.

In 2008, she won the general elections on the ticket of the New Patriotic Party for the same constituency. Her constituency was part of the 34 parliamentary seats out of 39 seats won by the New Patriotic Party in that election for the Ashanti Region. The New Patriotic Party won a minority total of 109 parliamentary seats out of 230 seats. She was elected with 36,708 votes out of 48,476 total valid votes cast equivalent to 75.72% of total valid votes cast. She was elected over Nana Osei Akoto-Kuffour of the National Democratic Congress, Osei-Tutu Richard of the Convention People's Party, Eunice Owusu-Ansah of the Reformed Patriotic Democrats and Stephen Kwaku Saahene an independent candidate. These obtained 14.45%, 5.52%, 0.91% and 3.39% respectively of the total votes cast.

Minister for Aviation

On 7 January 2017, President Akuffo-Addo nominated her for the position of Minister of Aviation. She was vetted by the Appointments Committee of the Parliament of Ghana on 8 February 2017. During her vetting, she testified that she would improve the aviation industry in Ghana, and that her priority was to restart a national carrier by 2019. She was of the view that the unavailability of the carrier was depriving Ghana of several millions of cedis in revenue. The last national carrier was Ghana International Airlines, which collapsed in 2010. In March 2017, she announced that Ghana was progressing with its desire to become the aviation hub of the West African region.

Personal life

Dapaah is married with one child. She is a member of the Methodist Church.

See also
List of MPs elected in the 2004 Ghanaian parliamentary election
List of MPs elected in the 2008 Ghanaian parliamentary election

References

1954 births
Living people
New Patriotic Party politicians
Ghanaian MPs 2001–2005
Ghanaian MPs 2005–2009
University of Oslo alumni
University of Ghana alumni
People from Ashanti Region
Ghanaian Methodists
Harvard Kennedy School alumni
Women members of the Parliament of Ghana
21st-century Ghanaian women politicians